Phyllonorycter didymopa is a moth of the family Gracillariidae. It is known from South Africa and Namibia.

The length of the forewings is 2.9–3.2 mm. The forewings are elongate and the ground colour is ochreous brown with white markings. The hindwings are light, beige with a long light beige, slightly shiny fringe. Specimens were reared from mines collected in mid-January and mid-March.

The larvae feed on Dombeya rotundifolia. They mine the leaves of their host plant. The mine has the form of a long, narrow gallery, mainly along the edge of the leaf. Later it creates a gall-like swelling near the base of the disc.

References

Moths described in 1961
didymopa
Moths of Africa
Insects of Namibia